Fat Kid Rules the World is a 2012 comedy-drama film directed by Matthew Lillard in his directorial debut. It is based on the book of the same name and stars Jacob Wysocki, Matt O'Leary & Billy Campbell.

Plot

17-year-old Troy Billings is overweight and suicidal. He's saved by Marcus from jumping in front of a bus and begins an uneasy friendship with Marcus. Marcus then enlists the musically challenged Troy to become the drummer in a new punk rock band. As Troy's relationship with Marcus grows, Troy's father becomes increasingly concerned about his son's new friendship.

Cast

Jacob Wysocki as Troy  
Matt O'Leary as Marcus
Billy Campbell as Mr. Billings
Dylan Arnold as Dayle
Tyler Trerise as Manoj
Russell Hodgkinson as Marcus' Stepfather
Julian Gavilanes as Matt
Sean Donavan as Ollie
Lili Simmons as Isabel
Jeffrey Doornbos as Mr. Sherman
Matthew Lillard as Guidance Counsellor

Reception

Fat Kid Rules the World received positive reviews from critics and audiences, earning an 83% approval rating on Rotten Tomatoes.

External links

2012 films
Films based on American novels
American comedy-drama films
2010s English-language films
2010s American films